Château de La Motte-Tilly is a castle in the La Motte-Tilly,  south-west of Nogent-sur-Seine, Champagne-Ardenne, France. It is on the left bank of the Seine and has been open to the public since 1978. The château is managed by the Centre des monuments nationaux.

The old castle, was first recorded in 1369. It was surrounded by a moat (which is still visible) and belonged to the lords of Trainel, then to the Raguier family, followed by the Elbeyne and Bournonville families.  Finally in 1710 Louis XIV gave it to Marshal Duke Adrien Maurice de Noailles. The old castle was demolished and a new manor house was built in 1754 according to a design by the architect François-Nicolas Lancret. The new structure was intended to be a hunting lodge.

Notwithstanding that La Motte-Tilly was (and is) still described as a "château", the current building is in fact a house in the French baroque style, and is not fortified. In this it is similar to many other French country houses (for example the Château de Cheverny), and indeed houses elsewhere in Europe (such as Castle Howard in England, which is an unfortified stately home), where the nomenclature has expanded beyond the strictly accurate.

References

External links

 Official website

Castles in Grand Est
Châteaux in Aube
Monuments of the Centre des monuments nationaux